Yoo Hwe-seung (born February 28, 1995) is a South Korean singer and musical theatre actor known for his work as a vocalist of the South Korean band N.Flying.

Career

Pre-debut 
Yoo signed with FNC Entertainment as a trainee in October 2016.

2017: Produce 101, Debut with N.Flying and Original soundtrack 
Yoo participated in Produce 101 Season 2, in which he ended up at 39th place. On June 19, it was announced that Yoo would be joining N.Flying as their newest member. He made his official debut as a member and main vocalist of N.Flying on August 2 with the group's second mini album, The Real: N.Flying. Yoo released his first solo original soundtrack, entitled "Another Day", for the South Korean drama Criminal Minds on September 14.

2018–present: Solo activities and musical roles 
In April 2018, Yoo participated in King of Masked Singer. He first appeared in episode 147, which he showed himself as "Gameboy". He successfully entered the final round in which he was able to challenge the king, but was defeated by the king.

Yoo released the track "Still Love You" as part of his collaboration with Lee Hong-gi of F.T. Island under FNC LAB.

In 2019, Yoo made his solo appearance in KBS's music competition program, Immortal Songs 2 in 2019. He received his first ever overall win in the program on October 19, 2019, with a total vote of 432. He performed a cover of Queen's "We Are The Champions", which earned him the win.

In October 2019, Yoo announced his musical debut for the musical We Will Rock You, starting from December 2019. He played as the male lead, Galileo in his debut play.

Personal life 
Yoo finished his mandatory military service before his debut.

Yoo has three older sisters.

Discography

Singles

Soundtrack appearances

Filmography

Television show

Musical theatre

References 

1995 births
Living people
South Korean male musical theatre actors
South Korean male idols
South Korean male singers
South Korean pop singers